The 1964 season was the third season of national competitive association football in Australia and 81st overall.

Cup competitions

Australia Cup

The competition began on 26 September 1964 (excluding preliminary rounds). Twenty-six clubs had entered, but seven of those withdrew so there were just nineteen actual participants. The competition with the final two clubs George Cross and APIA Leichhardt qualifying for the Final. George Cross won the match 3–2 after extra time, with one goal each from Archie Campbell and two own goals.

Final

References

External links
 Football Federation Australia official website

1964 in Australian soccer
Seasons in Australian soccer